Ornago is a comune (municipality) in the Province of Monza and Brianza in the Italian region Lombardy, located about  northeast of Milan.

References

External links
 Official website